Benjamin Kipkurui (born 28 December 1980 in Molo) is a Kenyan runner who specializes in the 1500 metres. He holds the world junior record in 1000 metres with 2:15.00 minutes, achieved on 17 July 1999 in Nice.

He belongs to the Kipsigis tribe.

Achievements

Personal bests
800 metres - 1:44.56 min (1999)
1500 metres - 3:30.67 min (2001)
One mile - 3:49.34 min (2000)

External links

1980 births
Living people
Kenyan male middle-distance runners
African Games bronze medalists for Kenya
African Games medalists in athletics (track and field)
Athletes (track and field) at the 2003 All-Africa Games